Prince Louis, Duke of Nemours (1814–1896) was second son of King Louis-Philippe I of France and Maria Amalia of Naples and Sicily.

Louis, Duke of Nemours  may also refer to:

Louis d'Armagnac, Duke of Nemours (1472–1503)
Louis I, Duke of Nemours (1615–1641)
Louis, Duke of Orléans (1703–1752) (1703–1752)